HD 108874 c is a gas giant discovered in 2005 which orbits beyond the star's habitable zone, and receives insolation 15.9% that of Earth. It has minimum mass similar to Jupiter, although since the inclination of the orbit is not known the true mass of this planet could be much greater.
The planet is possibly in a 4 : 1 orbital resonance with HD 108874 b.

References

External links 
 The Extrasolar Planets Encyclopedia: HD 108874 c

Coma Berenices
Giant planets
Exoplanets discovered in 2005
Exoplanets detected by radial velocity